Yaur or Jaur is a language in the putative Cenderawasih (Geelvink Bay) branch of the Austronesian family spoken in Papua province, Western New Guinea.  It has about 300 speakers.

See also
Yaur people

References

 Moseley, Christopher and R. E. Asher, ed. Atlas of World Languages (New York: Routledge, 1994) p. 111

South Halmahera–West New Guinea languages
Languages of western New Guinea
Papua (province) culture